Obeid Rashid (Arabic:عبيد راشد; born 1 May 1997) is an Emirati footballer. He currently plays as a forward for Al Dhaid.

Career
Obeid Rashid started his career at Dibba Al-Fujairah and is a product of the Dibba Al-Fujairah's youth system. On 23 November 2018, Obeid Rashid made his professional debut for Dibba Al-Fujairah against Al-Sharjah in the Pro League, replacing Saeed Al-Naqbi . landed with Dibba Al-Fujairah from the UAE Pro League to the UAE First Division League in 2018-19 season.

References

External links
 

1997 births
Living people
Emirati footballers
Dibba FC players
Masafi Club players
Al Dhaid SC players
UAE Pro League players
UAE First Division League players
Association football forwards
Place of birth missing (living people)